János Antal (born 7 October 1888, date of death unknown) was a Hungarian middle-distance runner. He competed in the men's 800 metres at the 1912 Summer Olympics.

References

External links

1888 births
Year of death missing
Athletes (track and field) at the 1912 Summer Olympics
Hungarian male middle-distance runners
Olympic athletes of Hungary
Place of birth missing
20th-century Hungarian people